The 1985 Major League Baseball season ended with the Kansas City Royals defeating the St. Louis Cardinals in the seventh game of the I-70 World Series.  Bret Saberhagen, the regular season Cy Young Award winner, was named MVP of the Series.  The National League won the All-Star Game for the second straight year.

The League Championship Series playoffs were expanded to a best-of-seven format beginning this year, and both leagues ended up settling their pennant winners in more than five games, with the Royals beating the Toronto Blue Jays in seven games, and the Cardinals beating the Los Angeles Dodgers in six games. This was the first full season for Peter Ueberroth as commissioner.

Standings

American League

National League

Postseason

Bracket

Managers

American League

National League

Awards and honors
Baseball Hall of Fame
Lou Brock
Enos Slaughter
Arky Vaughan
Hoyt Wilhelm

Other awards
Outstanding Designated Hitter Award: Don Baylor (NYY)
Roberto Clemente Award (Humanitarian): Don Baylor (NYY)
Rolaids Relief Man Award: Dan Quisenberry (KC, American); Jeff Reardon (MON, National).

Player of the Month

Pitcher of the Month

Statistical leaders

All-Star game
All-Star Game, July 16 at the Metrodome in Minneapolis: National League, 6–1; LaMarr Hoyt, MVP.

Milestones
On August 4, at Yankee Stadium, Tom Seaver won his 300th game as a member of the Chicago White Sox.
On August 4, at Anaheim Stadium, Rod Carew got his 3000th hit as a member of the California Angels.
On September 11, Pete Rose reached 4,192 hits, breaking Ty Cobb's all-time major league career hits record.
On October 6, Phil Niekro won his 300th game and became the oldest pitcher (age 46) to record a shutout as a member of the New York Yankees.

Home Field Attendance & Payroll

Television coverage

References

External links
1985 Major League Baseball season schedule at Baseball Reference

 
Major League Baseball seasons